Russian State Vocational Pedagogical University (RSVPU) was founded in 1 of September 1979. It is situated in Ekaterinburg, Russia. RSVPU is a federal state autonomous educational institution of higher education, which consists of colleges, institutes and departments, branches and representative offices in different cities of Russia.

The rector of the university - Dorozhkin Eugene M., Doctor of Pedagogical Sciences, Professor, Member of the International Academy of Science Education.

The general destination of the university is to prepare specialists for pedagogy.

Structure 

Now about 20,000 of students take courses.

List of faculties:

1-Engineering and Pedagogical Institute 
2-Institute of Economics and Management
3-Art-Pedagogical Institute 
4-Institute of Pedagogical Jurisprudence 
5-Social Institute
6-Institute of Linguistics 
7-Institute of Sociology 
8-Institute of Psychology 
9-Institute of Informatics 
10-The Branch of sound engineering, cinema and TV producing 
11-The Branch of musical and computer technologies 
12-Institute of preparation for University studying 
13-Faculty of professional retraining and qualification improvement 
14-Institute of crafts development 
15-Institute of vocational education informatization - See more at: http://en.russia.edu.ru/idbv/#id=166

External links
 Official web-site

Universities and institutes established in the Soviet Union
Universities in Sverdlovsk Oblast
Buildings and structures in Yekaterinburg
1979 establishments in Russia
Teachers colleges in Russia
Educational institutions established in 1979